Steve Marcus (September 18, 1939 – September 25, 2005) was an American jazz saxophonist.

Biography
Marcus was born in The Bronx, New York, United States. He studied at the Berklee College of Music in Boston, Massachusetts, between 1959 and 1961. He gained experience playing in the bands of Stan Kenton, Herbie Mann and Larry Coryell from 1963 to 1973. His first album as a leader included an arrangement of the Beatles' song, "Tomorrow Never Knows". He worked with jazz drummer Buddy Rich for the last twelve years of Rich's life. After Rich died, Marcus led the band and renamed it Buddy's Buddies.

His song "Half a Heart" (1968) has a riff very similar to the famous saxophone riff of "Baker Street" by Gerry Rafferty (recorded in 1977, released in 1978).

Marcus died in September 2005 in New Hope, Pennsylvania.

Discography

As leader/co-leader 
 Tomorrow Never Knows (Vortex, 1968)
 Count's Rock Band (Vortex, 1969)
 The Lord's Prayer (Vortex, 1969)
 Green Line with Miroslav Vitous, Sonny Sharrock, Daniel Humair (Nivico, 1970)
 Something with Jiro Inagaki & Soul Media (Nippon Columbia, 1971) – recorded in 1970
 Sometime Other Than Now (Flying Dutchman, 1976)
 Steve Marcus & 2o1 (Red Baron, 1992)
 Smile (Red Baron, 1993)
 Count's Jam Band Reunion (Tone Center, 2001) – recorded in 2000
 Steve Marcus Project (Mighty Quinn Productions, 2007)

As sideman 
With Gary Burton
 Tennessee Firebird (RCA, 1967) – recorded 1966

With Larry Coryell
 Barefoot Boy (Flying Dutchman, 1971)
 Offering (Vanguard, 1972)
 The Real Great Escape (Vanguard, 1973)

With Jazz Composer's Orchestra
 The Jazz Composers Orchestra (JCOA, 1968)[2LP]

With Stan Kenton
 Stan Kenton / Jean Turner (Capitol, 1963)
 Artistry in Bossa Nova (Capitol, 1963)

With Herbie Mann
 Live at the Whisky a Go Go (Atlantic, 1969)

With Bob Thiele Collective
 Lion Hearted (Red Baron, 1993)

With Young Rascals
 Once Upon a Dream (Atlantic, 1968) – recorded 1967

References

1939 births
2005 deaths
People from the Bronx
American jazz saxophonists
American male saxophonists
Red Baron Records artists
Flying Dutchman Records artists
20th-century American saxophonists
Jazz musicians from New York (state)
20th-century American male musicians
American male jazz musicians